Hunter is a beer in Bangladesh. It is the first beer brewed in Bangladesh. It's owned by the Bangladeshi conglomerate Jamuna Group.

History
Bangladesh Narcotics Control Act 1990 bans beer that contain alcohol defines it beer as a drink with alcohol content between 5% and 8.5%. Crown Beverages Ltd started making the beer with an alcohol content of less than 5%. Member of Parliament from the Islami Oikya Jote, Fazlul Huq Amini, and Member of Parliament from Jamaat-e-Islami Bangladesh, Delwar Hossain Sayeedi, had called the government to take action to prevent the sale of alcoholic drinks. Hunter beer can had been designed to imitate Fosters Beer. Beers were also sold under the crown brand which was modeled on Carlsberg Beer.

Department of Narcotics Control sued key people in Crown Beverages Ltd on 8 March 2004. In October 2009, Crown Beverage Ltd, a subsidiary of Jamuna Group, launched Hunter beer officially. It was the first beer to be produced in Bangladesh. The beer market in Bangladesh was of imported beers before the introduction of Hunter beer. Trial in the case filed by Department of Narcotics Control started in 2016.

References

Bangladeshi brands
Food and drink introduced in 2004
Beer in Bangladesh
Bangladeshi companies established in 2004
Food and drink companies established in 2004